Adamenka is a small river in the Bykhaw District, Mogilev Oblast, Belarus, a right tributary of  the Dnieper River.  The length of the river is 13 kilometers. The river has its source northeast of the village of Charnalesse (Чарналессе) and flows into Dnieper by the agrotown Novy Bykhaw.

References

Rivers of Mogilev Region
Bykhaw District
Tributaries of the Dnieper